National Tertiary Route 816, or just Route 816 (or ) is a National Road Route of Costa Rica, located in the Limón province.

Description
In Limón province the route covers Guácimo canton (Guácimo district).

References

Highways in Costa Rica